Giovanni Antonio Capello (1699, in Brescia – 1741) was an Italian painter of the late-Baroque period, active mainly in Brescia.

He was a pupil of the painters Pompeo Ghitti (1631–1703), later Lorenzo Pasinelli in Bologna, and finally in Rome with Giovanni Battista Gaulli. Some of his paintings recall the style of Pietro Testa.

References

1699 births
1741 deaths
18th-century Italian painters
Italian male painters
Painters from Brescia
Italian Baroque painters
18th-century Italian male artists